Flowbird (formerly Parkeon) is a French-headquartered company specializing in payment and ticketing systems, notably for car parks and public transport systems. The company was formed as a spin-off from Schlumberger in 2003.

Products

Products for car parks include Varioflex and Strada.

Products for public transport systems include the Wayfarer machine for buses and the Astreo, Galexio and ToDler ranges for railway stations.

References

External links
Flowbird - official website
 Flowbird UK website
 Flowbird US website

Fare collection systems
Companies based in Paris